This is a list of members (MSPs) returned to the fourth Scottish Parliament at the 2011 general election. Of the 129 MSPs, 73 were elected from first past the post constituencies with a further 56 members being returned from eight regions, each electing seven MSPs as a form of mixed member proportional representation.

The 2011 general election produced an unexpected majority government with the governing Scottish National Party winning 69 seats, to the opposition Scottish Labour Party's 37 (down seven seats from the previous election). First Minister, Alex Salmond went on to form his second government.

Composition 

Government parties denoted with bullets (•)

Graphical representation
These are graphical representations of the Scottish Parliament showing a comparison of party strengths as it was directly after the 2011 general election and its composition at the time of its dissolution in March 2016:

  

Note this is not the official seating plan of the Scottish Parliament.

List of MSPs 

This is a list of MSPs at dissolution. The changes table below records all changes in party affiliation during the session. See here a list of MSPs elected in the 2011 election.

Former MSPs

Changes

References

External links
 Scottish Parliament website
 Current and previous Members of the Scottish Parliament (MSPs), on the Scottish Parliament website

4